Johnson Point is a point in the U.S. state of Washington.

Johnson Point was named in 1853 after Dr. J. R. Johnson, a pioneer citizen.

References

Landforms of Thurston County, Washington
Headlands of Washington (state)